Nicolaas Bernardus "Nico" Lutkeveld (9 September 1916 – 14 December 1997) was a Dutch javelin thrower. He competed at the 1948 Summer Olympics and finished in 16th place. He was eights at the 1946 and 1950 European Athletics Championships.

He was a national champion in 1938–1940, 1942, 1943, 1946–1951, 1953 and 1954. In 1935 he became the first Dutch athlete to cross the 60 m barrier, and by 1939 he raised the national record to 67.12 m.

References

1916 births
1997 deaths
Athletes (track and field) at the 1948 Summer Olympics
Dutch male javelin throwers
Olympic athletes of the Netherlands
Athletes from Amsterdam
20th-century Dutch people